Vladimir Quesada Araya (born 12 May 1966) is a former Costa Rican football player who played his entire career with Deportivo Saprissa, during the 1980s and 1990s.

Club career
Quesada came through the Saprissa youth system and made his professional debut for the club on 3 November 1985. With Saprissa, he won five national championships, as well as two CONCACAF Champions Cups. In August 1995, Quesada took over de captain's armband at Saprissa after Evaristo Coronado retired.

He totalled 412 league games for Saprissa, playing a club record 51 games in one, the 1994-95, season.

International career
He was part of the national team squad, that played in the 1990 FIFA World Cup held in Italy but one of six players who did not get any playing time. Nicknamed Muñequito, the defender collected 31 caps for the Tico's and represented his country at the 1991 UNCAF Nations Cup and the 1991 CONCACAF Gold Cup.

He played his final international on November 24, 1996 against Guatemala.

Managerial career
After retiring, he coached in Saprissa's minor league system and took charge of the senior team twice on an interim basis, before almost winning promotion with Fusión Tibás in 2005. He signed in 2006 as Santos de Guápiles coach, of Costa Rica's first division. He was dismissed by Santos in February 2007.

Personal life
Quesada is married to Miss Teen 1991, Gabriela Ramírez and their eldest daughter María Alejandra Quesada Ramírez also competes in beauty queen contests. She was Miss Teen Centroamérica y el Caribe 2008 . They also have a son, Alejandro.

References

External links
 

1966 births
Living people
Footballers from San José, Costa Rica
Association football defenders
Costa Rican footballers
Costa Rica international footballers
1990 FIFA World Cup players
1991 CONCACAF Gold Cup players
Deportivo Saprissa players
Costa Rican football managers
Deportivo Saprissa managers
Copa Centroamericana-winning players
CONCACAF Championship-winning players